Plectrohyla chrysopleura is a species of frog in the family Hylidae.
It is endemic to Honduras.
Its natural habitats are subtropical or tropical moist lowland forests, subtropical or tropical moist montane forests, and rivers.
It is threatened by habitat loss.

References

C
Endemic fauna of Honduras
Amphibians of Honduras
Frogs of North America
Critically endangered fauna of North America
Amphibians described in 1994
Taxonomy articles created by Polbot